J. Jayalalithaa was sworn in as Chief Minister of Tamil Nadu on 23 May 2015. Earlier Jayalalithaa was charged of Rs 66.66 crore disproportionate assets case and forced to resign in the year 2014. O. Panneerselvam her trusted aide assumed the office then resigned after her return in 2015.

Cabinet ministers

Achievements

In 2015, The Government introduced Amma Master Health checkup plan where in people could get various treatments done at a low fee in government hospitals and rolled out Amma Arogya plan wherein at primary health care centre in Tamil Nadu, certain tests can be done by public twice a week. This was done to help the sections of society who cannot afford the fares asked for by private hospital. Later in February 2016, The Government started the free bus ride scheme for senior citizens above age of 60 wherein person could travel free of cost for 10 times a month. The Government initiated Global Investors Summit in 2015 which saw over Rs 2.43 lakh crore worth of investments being committed to the state. Jayalalithaa's term, all of them together, saw some big-ticket investments in the state and over $20 billion FDI. The department of industrial policy and promotion data disclosed that Tamil Nadu saw foreign direct investment inflows of $7.3 billion from April 2000 to March 2011; however, this went up to $13.94 billion from April 2011 to December 2015, under Jayalalithaa government, which at as per conversion rate  equals Rs 83,766 crore. Between April 2015 and December 2015, the State attracted $4.3 billion in FDI.

In June 2015, Pakistani news channels Samaa TV and Geo News aired a news and applauded Jayalalithaa for her government's scheme which was introduced in 2013, of supplying free rice to mosques during Ramzan and suggested the scheme should be implemented in Pakistan too.

References 

All India Anna Dravida Munnetra Kazhagam
J
2010s in Tamil Nadu
2015 establishments in Tamil Nadu
Cabinets established in 2015
2015 in Indian politics